Jörgen Mårtensson (born 4 December 1959) is one of the most successful Swedish orienteer of all times. Twice a winner of the World Orienteering Championships, he also won the 5 days O-Ringen in 1981 (at age 21), 1996 and 1997 (at age 37). Furthermore, he won the Swedish Championship in Marathon at Stockholm Marathon in 1993 . Now retired, he had one of the longest spanning careers in orienteering at world class level, taking part in World Championships over a period of twenty years. Starting with the 1978 World Orienteering Championships, where he placed eighth in the individual contest, he competed in every world championship until 1997.

Results 
World Orienteering Championships
Gold medals (2)
1991 – long distance – Marianske Lazne, Czechoslovakia
1995 – long distance – Detmold, Germany
Silver medals (5)
1981 – relay – Thun, Switzerland
1985 – relay – Bendigo, Australia
1989 – relay – Skaraborg, Sweden
1993 – long distance – West Point, US
1995 – short distance – Detmold, Germany
1997 – long distance – Grimstad, Norway
Bronze medals (2)
1987 – relay – Gérardmer, France
1995 – relay – Detmold, Germany

References

External links 
 
 
 Homepage of Jörgen Mårtensson
 
 

1959 births
Living people
Swedish orienteers
Male orienteers
Foot orienteers
World Orienteering Championships medalists